Enkakkad  is a village in Thrissur district in the state of Kerala, India.It is a small village with beautiful nature.There are many temples like Shri Veeranimangalam temple,Shri Kovil etc. in this village.the famous temple Uthralikavu is situated in Enkakkad.It is famous for its pooram festival. Enkakkad is the birth place of Oduvil Kunhikrishna Menon (writer), Bharathan (film director), Oduvil Unnikrishnan and KPAC Lalitha (actors).

Demographics
 India census, Enkakkad/Enkakad had a population of 8906 with 4232 males and 4674 females.

References

Villages in Thrissur district

ml:എങ്കക്കാട്